Illinois is a Democratic stronghold in presidential elections and one of the "big three" Democratic strongholds alongside California and New York. It is one of the most Democratic states in the nation with all state executive offices and both state legislative branches held by Democrats. For most of its history, Illinois was widely considered to be a swing state, voting for the winner of all but two presidential elections in the 20th century. Political party strength in Illinois is highly dependent upon Cook County, and the state's reputation as a blue state rests upon the fact that over 40% of its population and political power is concentrated in Chicago, Cook County, and the Chicago metropolitan area. Outside of Chicago, the suburban collar counties continue trending Democratic while downstate Illinois can be considered more conservative with several Democratic leaning regions including Champaign-Urbana, Bloomington-Normal, Rockford, Peoria, and suburban St. Louis

However, it has a history of competitive statewide elections and has elected a small number of moderate Republicans including Governors Jim Edgar, George Ryan, and Bruce Rauner, Senators Peter Fitzgerald and Mark Kirk, and other state executive officeholders including Judy Baar Topinka and Dan Rutherford.

The following table indicates the party of elected officials in the U.S. state of Illinois:
Governor
Lieutenant Governor
Secretary of State
Attorney General
Comptroller (Auditor before 1972)
Treasurer

The table also indicates the historical party composition in the:
State Senate
State House of Representatives
State delegation to the U.S. Senate
State delegation to the U.S. House of Representatives

Table

Regarding resignations and appointments; the person who held the office for the majority of the year is listed as the office holder for that year.

Gallery

See also
Elections in Illinois
Government of Illinois
Politics in Illinois
Politics of Illinois
Workingmen's Party of Illinois

References

Guild III, William (September 1999). "William Guild, Sr." DCBA Brief. Retrieved on 11 Feb. 2009.
 Inventory of the Latham Castle Collection (Historical Sketch). Notes maintained by Northern Illinois University Library. Retrieved on 11 Feb. 2009.

Political parties in Illinois
Illinois
Politics of Illinois